is a current single-member electoral district for the House of Representatives, the lower house of the National Diet of Japan. It is located in Kumamoto and since 2017 covers roughly the Southern half of Kumamoto.

Before 2013, it consisted of a small section of the prefectural capital Kumamoto (the former towns of Tomiai and Jōnan in today's Minami-ku), the cities of Amakusa, Uto, Kami-Amakusa and Uki and the remaining towns and villages of the former Amakusa, Upper (Kami-Mashiki) and Lower Mashiki (Shimo-Mashiki) counties. As of September 2012, 294,547 eligible voters were resident in the district.

Before 1996, the area had been part of the four-member Kumamoto 2nd district. Representatives had included Sunao Sonoda (DPJ→PDP→Progressive→JDP→LDP, 1947–1984) and his son Hiroyuki (LDP→NPH, 1986–1996). Hiroyuki Sonoda, deputy chief cabinet secretary during the LDP-JSP-NPH coalition, won the new single-member 4th district six times in a row after the electoral reform. In several elections, he was not even challenged by a candidate from the major party of the opposing bloc, exceptions were the initial election of 1996 and the "postal election" of 2005. In 2012, neither of the two established major parties contested the seat. Sonoda's main challenger in 2012, Masayoshi Yagami, had become a Liberal Democrat (JNP→NFP→LDP) when he represented the neighbouring 5th district in the 1990s, but became an independent for his two terms as mayor of Sagara and his failed run for governor of Kumamoto in 2008.

List of representatives

Election results

References 

Kumamoto Prefecture
Districts of the House of Representatives (Japan)